The 2021 California gubernatorial recall election was a special recall election that began in August 2021 and concluded on September 14, 2021, when California voters chose not to recall incumbent Democratic Governor Gavin Newsom, elected for the term January 2019 to January 2023.

Had the recall been successful, the replacement candidate with the most votes on the second part of the ballot would have assumed the office. The election followed the same format used in the November 2020 general election: in August, county election offices sent an official ballot to the mailing address of every registered voter, giving them the option to vote by mail on or before election day, or, when polling places opened statewide, to vote in-person. The recall petition was filed in February 2020 and signatures were collected from June 2020 to March 2021, with the signature drive gaining critical momentum in late 2020 amid voter anger over Newsom's personal behavior and leadership during the COVID-19 pandemic.

Voters' ability to recall an elected official in California is the result of Progressive Era democratic reforms intended to reduce corruption, enacted alongside the introduction of the ballot initiative and women's suffrage in 1911. Following a petition drive collecting signatures amounting to at least 12 percent of voters in the previous election for the political office in question, a special election is held. The election was the fourth gubernatorial recall election in American history and the second in state history after the 2003 recall election, which resulted in the successful recall of Governor Gray Davis, who was replaced with Arnold Schwarzenegger.

Due to the wide margin of the results, most major news outlets projected the race for Newsom within an hour of polls closing; later that night, Larry Elder, the frontrunner replacement candidate, conceded defeat. Official certification of the results occurred on October 22, 2021.

History 

Following their ascension into power in 1911, California's progressive Republican reformers introduced direct democracy with the recall (Proposition 8) and the initiative and referendum (Proposition 7) processes, alongside other sweeping democratic reforms like women's suffrage (Proposition 4), to weaken the corrupting power of private interests over the state's government (especially that of the enormously influential Southern Pacific Railroad), and restore, according to newly elected Governor Hiram Johnson, "the people's rule".

Prior to this election, the only other gubernatorial recall attempt in California to qualify for the ballot happened in 2003, which resulted in Gray Davis being replaced by Arnold Schwarzenegger. This election was the result of one of 179 attempts to recall a state-level elected official in California since voters gained the right to recall in 1911, one of 55 attempts to recall a governor, and one of six such efforts to remove Newsom. Every California governor since 1960 has experienced some form of a recall attempt. Of the ten prior recall attempts on state-level elected officials in California which led to special recall elections, six ultimately resulted in their removal from office by voters. The recall election was the fourth gubernatorial recall election ever held in the United States; the other three were in North Dakota in 1921, California in 2003, and Wisconsin in 2012.

Newsom recall petition (June 2020–March 2021) 

During Newsom's tenure as governor, a total of seven recall petitions have been launched against him. On February 20, 2020, the petition which led to the 2021 recall election was served against Newsom. It stated, "People in this state suffer the highest taxes in the nation, the highest homelessness rates, and the lowest quality of life as a result." The timing of the recall attempt coincided with the onset of the COVID-19 pandemic. The basis for previous recall attempts included the state's "Universal Healthcare and laws regarding illegal aliens" and "homelessness". 

On June 10, 2020, then-Secretary of State Alex Padilla approved petitioners' petitions for circulation. The recall petition focused on a variety of grievances, on issues such as sanctuary policies, homelessness, high taxes, and water rationing. Newsom's official response to the petition touted his support for funding education, health care, and infrastructure, noted the State's fiscal health, and warned that the recall campaign was a partisan attack that would result in a costly election.

The recall campaign hired a political consulting firm in late June 2020, and the initial plan was to pay circulators to collect signatures. To ensure a successful validation, the recall campaign sought to gather 2 million signatures. Given the difficulties in obtaining signatures during the pandemic, however, the per-signature cost rose dramatically, and petitioners opted to proceed with a team of approximately 5,000 volunteer circulators instead. The first proponent of the recall, Orrin Heatlie, played a grassroots role in the previous attempt led by aspiring Tea Party politician Erin Cruz. Heatlie, a former county sheriff's sergeant, was motivated by his disapproval of a video in which Newsom advised immigrants of their right not to be subject to warrantless searches.

The petition was initially given a signature deadline of November 17, 2020, but was extended to March 17, 2021, by Sacramento County Superior Court Judge James P. Arguelles due to the pandemic. Arguelles ruled that recall proponents could have a longer time window to collect signatures than they normally would have under non-pandemic circumstances.

Party at The French Laundry 

Newsom was widely criticized in November 2020 for his attendance at a birthday party with more than three households at The French Laundry restaurant in Yountville in the Napa Valley, despite guidelines issued by his administration ahead of an expected holiday COVID-19 surge, which limited private gatherings to at most three households. Also in attendance were multiple lobbyists, including both the head lobbyist and the CEO of the California Medical Association. Newsom and his office initially defended the outing while saying it was the first time he and his wife dined with others in public since the COVID-19 pandemic began, that public dining recommendations were separate from state guidelines for private gatherings, and that the party was held outdoors.

The day after Newsom claimed the party had been held outdoors, photographs showing an enclosed and maskless gathering were published and widely shared. Neighboring diners said Newsom's party was so loud, restaurant staff closed off their garage-like dining space with sliding glass doors, essentially making an indoor dining space. Napa County was in the "orange tier" of pandemic severity at the time, which permitted some indoor dining. Newsom later apologized for attending the celebration. The incident severely damaged Newsom's image and credibility amid the public health crisis.

This incident and voter anger over lockdowns, job losses, and school and business closures were widely credited for the recall petition's surge in support. Other reasons included a $31 billion fraud scandal at the state unemployment agency and pre-pandemic grievances over homelessness and high taxes. By August 2020, the petitioners had submitted 55,000 valid signatures, and from August 2020 through October 2020, a total of 890 new valid signatures were submitted. Coincidentally, both the French Laundry party and the extension of the signature collection deadline happened on November 6, 2020 and between November 5, 2020 and December 7, 2020, over 442,000 new signatures were submitted and verified; 1,664,010 valid signatures, representing roughly 111 percent of the 1,495,709 minimum required signatures and 98 percent of the 1,719,900 final certified signature count, would be submitted from November 2020 to the March 2021 deadline.

Reactions 
Though the state's Republican Party establishment was not involved with the launch of the recall petition, the growing recall effort eventually received the attention and support of statewide and nationwide Republicans, with the Republican Governors Association commissioning a poll involving prospective candidates in February 2021. In January 2021, Newsom refused to acknowledge the developing recall movement when questioned by reporters. In January 2021, Rusty Hicks, the chairman of the California Democratic Party, likened it to the storming of the U.S. Capitol, calling it the "California coup". The comparison drew bipartisan criticism, with Newsom's former deputy chief of staff, Yashar Ali, saying it was "absolutely insane to frame a recall where the voters go to the polls a coup".

Certification 

The recall campaign submitted 2,117,730 signatures by the March 2021 deadline. On April 26, 2021, the office of Secretary of State Shirley Weber announced that the recall effort had gained enough signatures to pass the 1,495,709 threshold and qualify for the ballot, pending official certification after a period of 30 days where voters could retract their signatures and where state officials tallied the costs to conduct the election (up to 60 days). The count yielded 1,719,943 valid signatures, which was roughly 13.8 percent of votes cast in 2018, exceeding the 12 percent threshold required to trigger the recall election. On June 23, 2021, the secretary of state announced that only 43 recall signatories withdrew their signatures statewide prior to the withdrawal deadline, resulting in a final count of 1,719,900 signatures (224,191 more than the required total), and all but ensuring a special election to recall Newsom from the governor's office.

After official certification, Lieutenant Governor Eleni Kounalakis was legally required to call the election within 60 to 80 days (per recent changes in recall election procedures signed by Governor Newsom, which eliminated the election cost review requirements if sufficient funding had been appropriated for the election). The signature drive was officially certified on July 1, 2021 and on the same day, Kounalakis called the election for September 14, 2021 (76 days later and the last Tuesday within the 60 to 80 day time period available to Kounalakis).

Recall campaigning (March 2021–September 2021) 
Newsom's opponents said he was being dishonest when in a March 16, 2021, interview with Jake Tapper of CNN, he said, "I've been living through Zoom school and all of the challenge related to it," since his children had been receiving in-person instruction at their private school since October 2020, unlike schoolchildren in many densely-populated and urban public school districts in California. Newsom made the comments while conducting a public outreach effort to address the all-but-certain recall. The COVID-19 pandemic in California led to widespread school closures, the emergence of distance learning, and student mental health and academic challenges, and by the summer of 2021, education became a prominent issue in the recall campaign. Republican candidates said the public K-12 school system failed to adequately serve students after teachers unions' demands led to extended shutdowns, and proposed a statewide voucher system, whereby parents could use their share of per-pupil state funding on the public, charter, or private school of their choice.

Ahead of the September recall election,  President Joe Biden and Vice President Kamala Harris campaigned for Newsom. At a rally in Long Beach on the eve of the election, Biden said, "Folks, send a message to the nation: Courage matters, leadership matters, science matters. Vote to keep Gavin Newsom." Both Biden and Newsom likened the frontrunner candidate Larry Elder to Trump, with Newsom warning, "We may have defeated Donald Trump, but we have not defeated Trumpism. Trumpism is still on the ballot in California."

Newsom's campaign ran television ads in September 2021 that called his Republican opponents' positions "anti-vax" and called the outcome of the recall vote "a matter of life and death. All four major Republican candidates (Elder, Faulconer, Kiley, and Cox) opposed vaccine mandates, although none contended that the vaccines were dangerous and all said that they had been vaccinated against the virus. Among the Republican candidates, Faulconer was the strongest advocate of COVID-19 vaccination; Cox had an "evolving position" but eventually recommended that everyone get vaccinated against COVID-19, and Elder and Kiley said that individuals should make up their own minds. Elder pledged, if elected, to repeal all face-covering and COVID-19 testing requirements for state workers.

Newsom under recall 

Although the recall petition was introduced in February 2020, before the onset of the COVID-19 pandemic, Newsom's response faced scrutiny by recall supporters and the news media. Many in favor of recalling Newsom cited issues unrelated to the pandemic as reasons for their support.

Newsom presided over an unexpected surplus in the state's 2021 finances, attributable to the recovery in the stock market, the state's progressive tax code, and $26 billion in federal aid, and announced a $100 billion post-pandemic spending proposal in May 2021 which would expand the eligibility for stimulus checks issued by the state to higher-wage earners with an additional payment to those with children, provide rental and utility assistance, and give funds to small businesses. While Newsom was required to return some of the surplus to taxpayers due to the Gann limit, which requires surplus funds to "be returned by a revision of tax rates or fee schedules", the Howard Jarvis Taxpayers Association said the law was likely being misapplied with the issuance of rebate checks to targeted constituencies rather than with the reduction of tax rates for all taxpayers. A report from the nonpartisan Legislative Analyst's Office, published shortly after the proposal was revealed, said that when considering spending that must go towards public schools, pay off debt, or be placed in the state's main reserve account, the surplus was actually $38 billion, not $75 billion as claimed by Newsom, that the proposal was being rushed since more time was needed to determine which solutions would be effective, and that the proposal was "shortsighted and inadvisable" since it requested $12 billion from the state's existing reserves in spite of the surplus. Newsom's Democratic predecessor Jerry Brown said the spending plans were "not sustainable" and said, "I would predict, certainly within two years, we're going to see fiscal stress." Proponents of Newsom's proposal said the high amount of spending was "historic" and would help the economy recover from the pandemic, while opponents said Newsom's proposal was crafted in response to the imminent recall election. According to state officials, a stimulus payment would be issued to eligible individuals starting in September 2021. The first round of 600,000 stimulus checks was directly deposited into bank accounts on August 27, 2021, with payments to other recipients scheduled to be disbursed every two weeks.

In May 2021, Kaiser Health News reported that throughout the COVID-19 pandemic, Newsom was "routinely outsourcing life-or-death public health duties to his allies in the private sector" with lucrative no-bid government contracts. The report said the "vast majority" of awardees were Newsom supporters and donors who had collectively donated $113 million to his political campaigns (including to his campaign to fight the recall), charitable causes, or policy initiatives, since his entry into state-level politics in 2010.

In June 2021, The Sacramento Bee reported that the non-profit organization founded by Newsom's wife, Jennifer Siebel Newsom, had received over $800,000 in donations from companies that lobbied or did business with California state government, and paid her over $2.3 million since 2011 for leading the organization and producing documentary films through her production company, Girl's Club Entertainment. When questioned about his wife's non-profit, Newsom denied that there was any conflict of interest with the arrangement. In response to the report, several recall challengers called for a ban on donations to non-profit organizations of elected officials' family members from companies engaged in business with the state.

Partisanship 
The recall effort was not launched by state Republican Party apparatus, but by activists who had unsuccessfully attempted to recall Newsom before; the activists said the party establishment did not get involved in a substantial way until the recall effort had almost triggered the election.

Newsom did not acknowledge the recall election until its occurrence became all but certain, calling the effort "partisan, Republican". He recruited nationwide Democrats to help fundraise against it. State Democratic leaders warned members of their party against running in the recall election to avoid a potential split electorate, which some attribute to the 2003 recall of Governor Gray Davis, where Democratic Lieutenant Governor Cruz Bustamante was defeated in his candidacy by Republican Arnold Schwarzenegger. A May 2021 UC Berkeley Institute of Government Studies poll sponsored by the Los Angeles Times found that Democratic voters overwhelmingly preferred having a prominent Democratic replacement candidate on the ballot in case the recall was successful, at odds with attempts by party leadership to prevent such a scenario.

Former Governor Arnold Schwarzenegger disputed the supposed partisan motives of the recall, comparing the 2021 effort to the successful 2003 recall and saying, "It's pretty much the same atmosphere today as it was then. There was dissatisfaction, to the highest level. And it's the same with the momentum. Something that sets it off to a higher level, kind of the straw that breaks the camel's back ... like an explosion." Democratic strategist Katie Merrill said that the chance for a successful recall in 2021 was low: "Politically, we're a completely different state than we were in 2003. If you look at the statewide races, the Republican Party has effectively become a third party in California."

Newsom sought to connect the backers of the recall effort to "the RNC, anti-mask and anti-vax extremists, and pro-Trump forces", while recall proponents said that the recall was only about Newsom and his performance as governor, and claimed that around one-third of recall petition signatories were registered Democrats or independents. As of April 30, 2021, nearly a year after the recall campaign was approved for petition circulation by the secretary of state, Trump had yet to personally comment on the recall effort. In September 2021, Trump commented on the recall election, claiming without evidence that it was "probably rigged".

Despite the CDC's mid-May guidance that it was not necessary for persons fully vaccinated against COVID-19 to wear masks in most indoor settings, Newsom's administration decided that California would continue its indoor mask mandate for another month, until June 15, 2021. Reception to the CDC's new guidance among public health experts had been mixed, with some favoring quick implementation and others favoring a delay, including Bob Wachter, chair of the UCSF Department of Medicine, who called the CDC's new guidance "premature". The delayed implementation was criticized by UCSF scientist and COVID-19 expert Dr. Monica Gandhi who said it had no scientific rationale, while potentially causing harm by suggesting there is "still a danger when there isn't one". Isaac Hale, a lecturer of political science at UC Davis, said partisan politics concerning the recall may have been a factor in the decision:

"One of [the] top political priorities Newsom has is keeping the Democratic base together, which is why they're really focused on arguing the recall is a partisan Republican endeavor. The biggest thing that could damage that narrative is if a prominent Democrat or progressive emerged as a candidate in the recall, like Cruz Bustamante did in 2003. The key to Newsom staying in power is keeping the Democratic base happy, consolidated and making sure the California Democratic Party is the party of Gavin Newsom, and Gavin Newsom only. It's smart politics since mask mandates are popular among California Democrats."

Jack Citrin, a political science professor at UC Berkeley, said changing the electoral calendar threatened to reinforce the public's cynicism about politicians using any means available to stay in power, and that they were "trying to create a situation that is most favorable for the partisan outcome that they favor". The changes were heavily criticized by Newsom's Republican opponents.

In August, recall proponents filed suit challenging language proposed by Newsom for the voter information handbook, alleging it falsely or misleading characterized the recall as a "power grab" by "Republicans and Trump supporters". On August 5, 2021, Sacramento County Superior Court Judge Laurie M. Earl ruled against the suit and allowed inclusion of the disputed language, saying, "There is nothing false or misleading about describing the recall effort's leaders as Trump supporters." Judge Earl wrote that while it may have been an exaggeration to describe the election as a "Republican recall", the rhetoric was "common to political debate" and "permissible".

On July 24, 2021, the California Republican Party's steering committee voted to allow the party to endorse a candidate in the recall election, if the candidate received at least 60 percent of delegate votes in an upcoming August 7 meeting. Some Republicans opposed the move out of concern that endorsing a single candidate would reduce Republican voter turnout. On August 7, the party voted to cancel the endorsement vote and issue no endorsement; prior to the cancellation of the endorsement vote, Republican delegates were set to choose an endorsee from the four candidates who each had received the support of at least 200 delegates, which were Larry Elder, Kevin Faulconer, Kevin Kiley, and Doug Ose.

With political allies having successfully dissuaded prospective high-level Democrats from joining the race, Newsom's campaign urged supporters to skip the second question on the recall ballot. The directive was criticized by nonpartisan political observers, who said that it was misleading and could cause voter confusion.

Recall election (September 2021)

Election administration 

After some blueprints of the Dominion Voting Systems voting machines were leaked, a group of eight cybersecurity experts called, in a letter to Secretary of State Shirley Weber, for rigorous auditing of the recall election with a risk-limiting audit to mitigate any cyberattack risk. The experts wrote that they had no evidence of a hacking threat, and did not cast any blame on Dominion, but said that the state and counties should take steps to ensure that "the release of the Dominion software into the wild" did not increase election security risks. The California Secretary of State's office said the 40 counties in California using Dominion election management system use a different version of the software that meets state requirements, and noted that California election systems have layered security protections, including routine vulnerability testing, pre-election testing, access controls, and physical security. California also uses paper ballots with a voter-verified paper audit trail, another security measure.

Larry Elder's unsubstantiated fraud claim prior to election day 
The day before the end of voting, candidate Larry Elder claimed on his campaign website that fraud had already been detected and linked to a petition for citizens to sign "demanding a special session of the California legislature to investigate and ameliorate the twisted results" of the election, though no vote totals had yet been reported. Elder would concede defeat on election day. His claim that cast doubt on the legitimacy of the election result was accompanied by similar unsubstantiated claims from former President Donald Trump and several right-wing media figures.

California’s recall process 

As of 2021, California is one of 19 states to allow recall elections. Under state law, any elected official may be subjected to a recall. To trigger a recall election of a statewide elected official, proponents must gather a certain number of signatures from registered voters within a certain time period. The number must equal at least 12 percent of the votes cast in the previous election for that office. Based on the previous gubernatorial election, the 2021 recall petition required 1,495,709 signatures. When the secretary of state confirms that a recall petition meets the required number of signatures, a recall election must be scheduled within 60 to 80 days. If the petition qualifies fewer than 180 days prior to the next regularly scheduled election, then the recall becomes part of that regularly scheduled election. In the case of a recall against the governor, the responsibility for scheduling the recall election falls on the lieutenant governor, which for 2021 was Eleni Kounalakis.

A recall ballot in California consists of two parts: whether the incumbent should be recalled, and a selection of replacement candidates in the event they are recalled. If a simple majority of those who cast ballots favors removing the incumbent by selecting "YES" on the first question, then the replacement candidate who receives the most votes (a type of plurality voting) finishes out the incumbent's term in office. A voter is allowed a single unranked vote when choosing a preferred replacement candidate, irrespective of their response to the first question. If the recall had been successful, the new governor would have taken office 38 days after the election and served the remainder of the term through January 2, 2023. Following legislation, all registered voters would be mailed a ballot for any elections held in 2021, including the recall election (subsequent legislation signed by Governor Newsom in September 2021 would mandate the same universal mail-in format for all future state and local elections).

Changes to state recall election laws 
Though California's recall process remains fundamentally unchanged since its introduction in 1911, beginning in 2017 and up to the 2021 gubernatorial recall, California's Democratic-led government enacted legislation to change how recall elections are conducted. Several lawmakers and academics also proposed more substantial changes during the 2021 recall campaign that would later fail in the legislature and the courts; similar rule changes were proposed during California's 2003 recall election campaign that targeted Democrat Gray Davis. In addition, a new election law was applied to the 2021 recall election, though its application would later be ruled invalid in court.

Recall election timeline (SB 117 and SB 152) 
In 2017, ahead of the successful recall of State Senator Josh Newman (D-Fullerton), Democratic legislators changed the law concerning recall elections with Senate Bill 117 to give voters 30 business days to withdraw their names from the recall petition. The 2017 law change also added a 30 day period for the state Department of Finance to conduct a cost estimate and gave the Joint Legislative Budget Committee 30 days to review the estimate.

On June 28, 2021, Newsom signed Senate Bill 152 into law, which allowed for his recall election to be held as early as August 2021 by allowing for a shorter recall timeline, which had been lengthened prior to the recall of Senator Newman. The changes allowed the Lieutenant Governor to set a date for the recall without waiting for the Joint Legislative Budget Committee to review the cost estimate "so long as the Legislature has appropriated the funds it determines 'reasonably necessary' to conduct the recall election". With the same law change, the legislature appropriated $250 million to administer the recall election.

Election cost 
While Newsom's pre-pandemic response to the recall effort in early 2020 warned that a special recall election would cost $81 million, county officials estimated in June 2021 that a statewide recall election, which at the time was expected to be held in the fall of 2021, would cost taxpayers $215 million. This higher estimate had presumed higher paper costs due to California's requirements for universal mail-in ballots instituted during the COVID-19 pandemic, which covered all elections held in 2020 and 2021, as well as a lengthy recall calendar featuring the rule changes enacted in 2017, ahead of Senator Newman's recall.

With the shortened timeline from SB 152 now ensuring a summertime election, California's county election clerks nonetheless urged Lieutenant Governor Kounalakis to schedule the election as late as possible, citing an inability to guarantee a successful August election, possible voter confusion, and the potential for costs far beyond the original estimate. A summertime election, held in late August or early September, could have helped Newsom defeat the recall by avoiding political fallout over fires, virus variants, or school reopenings, which could coincide with what had been anticipated to be a late October or early November recall election; this strategic advantage was the rationale for public advocacy for an earlier election by Democratic State Senator Steve Glazer. On July 1, the Department of Finance released an estimate of the cost of the September 14, 2021 election at $276 million, an increase of $61 million from the prior $215 million estimated by county election offices.

Newsom's campaign and Democratic legislative leaders of both state houses had criticized the recall election as a waste of taxpayer money, while recall proponents said, "You can't put a price on democracy," and that some costs could have been avoided if officials allowed for a "traditional" election without universal mail-in ballots. While the projected $276 million cost of the recall was close to the $292 million spent on the 2020 general election in California, which was the first to feature universal mail-in ballots, the cost per voter was significantly higher than in the 2018 midterm elections.

Secretary of State Weber said in an interview with KABC-TV that the recall election's total cost by election day had surpassed $276 million and was on track to eventually exceed $300 million. On February 3, 2022, election officials released a final tally of the costs for the recall election, at a little over $200.2 million.

Incumbent's party preference (SB 151) 
In 2019, Newsom signed Senate Bill 151 into law, which gave recall targets the right to state their party preference on the recall ballot. Newsom was unable to take advantage of the new law after his campaign missed a February 2020 deadline (when the recall petition was filed) to state his party preference. In June and July 2021, Newsom's campaign sued Secretary of State Shirley Weber (whom he appointed earlier in 2021) over the issue, but lost the case. Weber sided with him, telling the judge that voters would benefit from knowing Newsom's political party preference. The lawyers arguing the case in opposition to Newsom before Judge James P. Arguelles (who had also approved the recall signature deadline extension) represented replacement candidate Caitlyn Jenner and proponents of the recall.

Misapplication of tax return disclosure law (SB 27) 

A new requirement for gubernatorial candidates to disclose their most recent tax returns was passed into law in 2019, when Governor Newsom signed Senate Bill 27. Although the language of the law says that gubernatorial candidates must publicize the prior five years of their tax returns in order for their names to appear on a "primary ballot", the secretary of state applied the law to the recall election. The law has been cited as a potential reason for the major reduction in recall replacement candidates relative to the number of candidates in the 2003 gubernatorial recall.

The tax return disclosure requirement did not apply to Newsom, who was not considered a "candidate" in the recall. Newsom's campaign nonetheless submitted his tax documents to Secretary of State Shirley Weber, who refused to publish them on the grounds that the Governor was not required to disclose them. Newsom's campaign did not respond to a reporter's July 19, 2021, request for his recent tax returns.

On July 21, 2021, Sacramento County Superior Court Judge Laurie Earl invalidated all tax return disclosure requirements for the 2021 recall election. The ruling was on a suit filed by prospective recall challenger Larry Elder against Secretary of State Weber, alleging she overstepped her authority by disqualifying him from his candidacy due to a purported tax return filing error. The judge ruled that Weber had improperly disqualified Elder, who had "substantially complied" with the requirements and that the special recall election was not a primary election and therefore Senate Bill 27 did not even apply. By then, 42 candidates' tax returns had already been made public by the secretary of state's office. Weber's office said it would comply with the ruling and did not appeal.

Constitutional legal challenge 
In August 2021, an essay by UC Berkeley School of Law Dean Erwin Chemerinsky and UC Berkeley Professor of Law and Economics Aaron Edlin appeared in The New York Times claiming California's recall process violates the Constitution of the United States, since more people could vote to retain Newsom than for any particular candidate while still ousting him, thus potentially violating "one person, one vote" legal precedent (conversely, if a majority of voters favored retaining Newsom, but an even greater number of voters favored a particular replacement candidate, Newsom would nonetheless prevail). Charles C. W. Cooke, writing in The National Review in the same month, criticized the rationale and timing of the essay's publication and said Chemerinsky had selectively taken issue with California's recall, in which a Democrat was targeted, by not bringing up the pivotal 2020–21 United States Senate election in Georgia, which would also be invalid by his logic. Many experts have said the current recall process would probably survive legal challenges.

On August 13, 2021, two California voters filed a federal lawsuit against California's recall process, with formerly disbarred attorney Stephen Yagman and Joseph Reichmann as counsel, alleging violation of the U.S. Constitution's Equal Protection Clause. California Attorney General Rob Bonta said on August 16, 2021, that he was monitoring the lawsuit and legal debate; by then, millions of ballots had already been sent out. On August 27, 2021, United States District Court for the Central District of California Judge Michael W. Fitzgerald, an Obama appointee, dismissed the lawsuit. Judge Fitzgerald, in his ruling, said of the plaintiffs' grievances: "Such disgruntlement raises no federal constitutional issues and certainly does not give the federal judiciary the right to halt the mammoth undertaking of this gubernatorial recall election." The office of Secretary of State Shirley Weber (the defendant in the case) said they would not appeal the ruling.

Proposed changes to state recall election law 
In April 2021, two bills that could make future recalls less likely were introduced in the California Senate: the first, a bill originally authored by Senator Ben Allen (D-Redondo Beach) two years prior, in response to the recall of Senator Josh Newman, would allow a targeted incumbent to be a candidate on the recall ballot; the second, authored by Senator Josh Newman (who by 2020 had reclaimed his lost state senate seat) would have allowed targets of recall campaigns to access the lists of recall petition signers and try to persuade them to remove their signatures. Neither bill would have impacted the 2021 recall election.

Newman's proposed law (Senate Bill 663) cleared the State Senate's Elections Committee on April 12, but he pulled the bill before it headed to the Judiciary Committee after it received fierce opposition from proponents of the 2021 recall over privacy and voter intimidation concerns. As of July 2021, Senator Allen's bill (Senate Constitutional Amendment 3) was on hold in the legislative "suspense file".

In September 2021, while voting in the recall election was underway, Democratic State Assembly Speaker Anthony Rendon said discussions were being held to alter California's recall process; support and opposition to changes in the recall process in California have fallen along partisan lines. Any major changes to the recall process must be approved by California's voters via an amendment to the Constitution of California.

Fundraising 
California's recall process requires that campaigns supporting challengers adhere to the usual campaign finance limits for political candidates, while there is no dollar limit for a donor's contribution to the campaign of the defending incumbent, nor for donations to groups advocating narrowly for the recall of the incumbent while not supporting any specific challenger. For the 2021 recall election, the maximum amount that a donor could have given to a candidate (other than Newsom) was $32,400.

By June 2021, the three biggest donors to Newsom's campaign against the recall were the California Association of Realtors, the California Democratic Party, and Reed Hastings. Prominent donors against the recall also included Steven Spielberg, George Soros, Jeffrey Katzenberg, Peter Chernin, J.J. Abrams and Katie McGrath, Laurene Powell Jobs, and Marissa Mayer. By June 3, 2021, labor unions across the state donated $2 million to Newsom's campaign against the recall and union leaders, while saying their side was already favored by voters, promised a get-out-the-vote drive to "make sure we secure those votes and talk to our members to ensure that base" through a door-to-door canvassing effort.

While organizers of the recall campaign said the effort was driven by grassroots supporters angry over pandemic restrictions and Newsom's attendance at the French Laundry dinner that defied his own guidelines, over half of the $4 million raised by recall proponents by March 2021 originated from two dozen Republican groups, along with wealthy companies and individuals, including Douglas Leone, David O. Sacks and Chamath Palihapitiya. Recall proponents said there was greater voter energy in favor of the recall and that despite having a small budget, an "unparalleled" volunteer base collected more than enough signatures for the "purposeful and organic" recall effort.

By May 26, 2021, $11.1 million and $4.6 million went to the pro-Newsom and pro-recall sides, respectively, with most funding for both sides originating from the same wealthy enclaves around the state. On August 4, 2021, the Los Angeles Times published updated campaign finance data for the upcoming recall election: Newsom's campaign was by far in the lead with $51 million raised, while $5.8 million had been raised by pro-recall committees unaffiliated with a candidate (most of the $5.8 million raised had already been spent during the signature gathering phase). Among challengers who had raised over a million dollars, John Cox reported the most, with $7.6 million (largely self-funded), followed by Faulconer, who reported $3.4 million (raised over a six-month period), and Elder, who reported over $1 million (raised over a three-week period).

After surviving the recall election, Newsom would decide the fate of numerous bills passed in the legislature and determine policy that could affect donors to his anti-recall campaign, which included the film and tech industries, real estate and labor union interests, and Native American tribes, who had collectively donated tens of millions of dollars to fight the recall (being unencumbered by donation limits), in what was described as a unique opportunity to attempt to buy influence in California's government.

Qualified replacement candidates 
To have been listed on the ballot as a replacement candidate, a candidate must have been a United States citizen and registered to vote in California, submitted signatures from 65 registered voters and paid a $4,194.94 filing fee (which could be waived with the submission of 7,000 signatures of registered voters). Candidates who had been convicted of a felony involving bribery or embezzlement of public money were not allowed to run.

The deadline for filing was July 16, 2021. Forty-six candidates qualified to appear on the recall ballot, consisting of 24 Republicans, nine Democrats, two Greens, one Libertarian, and ten no party preference. Four of the 46 candidates qualified after a Sacramento County judge invalidated application of SB 27 on recall elections and ordered California's Secretary of State to add candidates who did not meet requirements for tax return disclosure. The list of candidates on the ballot was certified on July 21, 2021. Additionally, seven write-in candidates were certified by the Secretary of State on September 3. Of the write-in candidates, their party affiliation consisted of two Democrats, one Republican, one American Independent, and three no party preference. Lieutenant Governor of California Eleni Kounalakis declined to run.

Top candidates

Debates 
The Richard Nixon Foundation announced plans for two debates during the month of August 2021: the first on August 4, and the second on August 22. The first debate was a 90-minute televised event held at the Nixon Presidential Library in Yorba Linda, California. Six Republican candidates (Faulconer, Elder, Cox, Jenner, Kiley, and Ose) were invited to participate, along with Newsom. The Nixon Foundation announced that all the Republican candidates, with the exception of Jenner, had accepted the invitation, and Gov. Newsom had not responded. A day after the debate was announced with Elder as a participant, the Elder campaign issued a statement that he would not attend the debate.

During the August 17 debate in Sacramento, Cox was served with a subpoena while on stage, and on camera. The subpoena by a San Diego County court was for failure to pay a debt of about $100,000 from his 2018 gubernatorial campaign. Ose had initially accepted the invitation to appear at the same debate, but dropped out of the race the day of the debate, and therefore did not attend. Elder announced that he would not attend the debate, nor any other debate in which Newsom is not attending.

During the August 25 debate in Sacramento, Kevin Paffrath called on the other three candidates onstage (Faulconer, Cox, and Kiley) to drop out of the race and endorse him, stating he feared a lame-duck governor would get nothing done.

Participation

Endorsements

On recall question

For candidates

Predictions

Polling

Results 

The recall election result was officially certified on October 22, 2021. Newsom had survived the recall with similar results as his first run for governor. No on recall votes exceeded that of what the votes Newsom received in 2018 by 200,000 votes and had a similar vote percentage as well. No on recall had also won nearly all counties that Newsom had, save for Merced County that voted for the recall by 4 points.

By county

On recall question 

Here are the results of the recall election by county. Khaki represents counties won by No. Light blue represents counties won by Yes.

On replacement candidates 

Here are the results of the election by county for replacement candidates. Red represents counties won by Elder. Blue represents a county won by Paffrath.

By congressional district

On recall question 
Here are the results of the recall election by congressional district. Khaki represents congressional districts won by No. Light blue represents congressional districts won by Yes. All districts with incumbent Democratic representatives voted for No except one, and all districts with incumbent Republican representatives voted for Yes except two.

Turnout and participation
The number of valid votes cast on the recall question (question 1) was vastly greater than the number cast on the replacement question (question 2). The Newsom campaign's official message to voters had been to vote "no" on the recall and to ignore the replacement question.

Commentary after election 

In an October 2021 interview with Chuck Todd at the Milken Institute Global Conference, Newsom commented on the personal impact of the recall, saying "it's hard", and that it was the result of "personal stupidity", which "took a life of its own" and was "weaponized" by opponents, and, "I mean, we colored it in. I took responsibility."

Recall candidate Larry Elder's support for the Trump administration, being unpopular among California's electorate, as well as his status as a front-runner and likely gubernatorial replacement if the recall was successful, were reported to have helped Newsom defeat it. Mid-summer polling conducted two months prior to election day suggested a close race. Newsom ultimately defeated the recall with a margin of roughly 24 percent after mobilizing Democrats to vote with a message that framed the race as a referendum on him versus Elder and their pandemic policy proposals. Newsom's campaigning had also invoked Elder's connections to the inner circle of former President Donald Trump, as well as his history of provocative right-wing rhetoric as a radio talk show host. Exit polling suggested the result fell along partisan lines, with 94 percent of self-reported Democrats saying they voted against the recall and 89 percent of self-reported Republicans saying they voted to remove Newsom from office.

The recall was widely invoked following the victory of Republican Glenn Youngkin two months later in the 2021 Virginia gubernatorial election (where Democrat Joe Biden had won in 2020 by 10 points); Virginia's race featured similar campaigning on education, the pandemic, and former President Trump.

See also 

1921 North Dakota gubernatorial recall election
2003 California gubernatorial recall election
2012 Wisconsin gubernatorial recall election
2021 United States gubernatorial elections
2022 California gubernatorial election

Notes

General polling notes

Polling sponsor notes

Other

References

External links 
California recall procedures guide
Complete list of recall election attempts in California – Secretary of State of California
Candidates for the 2021 California gubernatorial recall election, official listing

Anti-recall campaign 
Stop the Republican Recall, the official retention campaign for Gavin Newsom

Recall campaign 
Recall Gavin 2020, the official recall Gavin Newsom campaign

Official candidate campaign websites 

Angelyne (I) for Governor
David Bramante (R) for Governor
John Cox (R) for Governor 
John Drake (D) for Governor
Larry Elder (R) for Governor
Kevin Faulconer (R) for Governor 
Rhonda Furin (R) for Governor
Ted Gaines (R) for Governor
Sam Gallucci (R) for Governor 
James Hanink (I) for Governor
Jeff Hewitt (L) for Governor
Caitlyn Jenner (R) for Governor
Dan Kapelovitz (G) for Governor
Kevin Kaul (I) for Governor
Kevin Kiley (R) for Governor
Jenny Rae Le Roux (R) for Governor
Michael Loebs (I) for Governor
David Lozano (R) for Governor
Diego Martinez (R) for Governor
Daniel Mercuri (R) for Governor
Doug Ose (R) for Governor
Kevin Paffrath (D) for Governor
Adam Papagan (I) for Governor 
Armando Perez-Serrato (D) for Governor
Brandon Ross (D) for Governor
Major Singh (I) for Governor
Sarah Stephens (R) for Governor
Joe Symmon (R) for Governor
Anthony Trimino (R) for Governor
Joel Ventresca (D) for Governor
Daniel Watts (D) for Governor
Nickolas Wildstar (R) for Governor
Major Williams (R, Write-in) for Governor 

Gubernatorial recall
2021
California
Gavin Newsom
California 2021